Henri Eugène Philippe Louis d'Orléans, Duke of Aumale (16 January 1822 – 7 May 1897) was a leader of the Orleanists, a political faction in 19th-century France associated with constitutional monarchy. He was born in Paris, the fifth son of King Louis-Philippe I of the French and Maria Amalia of Naples and Sicily and used the title Duke of Aumale. 

Aumale became an infantry officer and saw active service in the French conquest of Algeria and in 1847 was appointed as its Governor-General. After the French Revolution of 1848, he went to live in England, where he pursued historical interests. The Franco-Prussian War enabled him to return to France, where he was elected to parliament and the Académie française. In 1872, he returned to the army as a Divisional General, and from 1879 to 1883 was inspector-general of the army.

An important art collector, Aumale left his Château de Chantilly to the Institute of France, to display his collection.

Early life
 

Born at the Palais Royal in Paris, the young Henri was brought up by his parents in relative simplicity. At the age of eight, he inherited a fortune of 66 million livres (approximately £200 million today), the lands and wealth of his godfather, Louis Henri de Bourbon, Prince of Condé, the last Prince of Condé. This inheritance included the famous Château de Chantilly, the Château d'Écouen, and the domaines of Saint-Leu, Taverny, Enghien, Montmorency, and Mortefontaine. 

He was educated at the Collège Henri IV, then at the age of seventeen entered the French army with the rank of a captain of infantry.

Marriage and children
On 25 November 1844, aged 22, Aumale married in Naples Princess Maria Carolina of the Two Sicilies, a daughter of Leopold of the Two Sicilies, Prince of Salerno, and Archduchess Maria Clementina of Austria. The couple had several children, of whom two reached adulthood, but still predeceased him:

Louis Philippe Marie Léopold d'Orléans, Prince of Condé (15 November 1845 – 24 May 1866), died unmarried and childless. 
Henri Léopold Philippe Marie d'Orléans, Duke of Guise (11 September 1847 – 10 October 1847), died in infancy.
Stillborn daughter (16 August 1850).
François Paul d'Orléans, Duke of Guise (11 January 1852 – 15 April 1852), died in infancy.
François Louis Philippe Marie d'Orléans, Duke of Guise (5 January 1854 – 25 July 1872), died unmarried.
Stillborn son (May 1857).
Stillborn son (15 June 1861).
Stillborn son (June 1864).

Career
Aumale distinguished himself during the French invasion of Algeria and, in 1847, he became lieutenant-general and was appointed Governor-General of Algeria, a position he held from 27 September 1847 to 24 February 1848.

In this capacity, he received the submission of the emir Abdel Kadir, in December 1847. After the Revolution of 1848, he retired to England and busied himself with historical and military studies, responding in 1861 to Napoleon III's violent attacks upon the House of Orléans with a Letter upon History of France.

After the Bavarian-born King Otto of Greece was overthrown in October 1862, the Greeks still favoured a monarchy and wanted Prince Alfred, Duke of Edinburgh, as their new king, but he declined. In the search for a king, the French put forward the name of Aumale, while other contenders included Ernest II, Duke of Saxe-Coburg and Gotha, the Prince of Leiningen, and Archduke Maximilian of Austria. Eventually, the choice fell on Prince William of Denmark, aged only seventeen, and the Greek National Assembly elected him as the new King of the Hellenes in March 1863.

At the outbreak of the Franco-Prussian War, Aumale volunteered for service in the French army, but his offer was declined. Elected to parliament as deputy for the Oise, he returned to France. He also succeeded to the seat of the Count Montalembert in the Académie française. 

In March 1872, he returned to the army as a Divisional General and in 1873 presided over the court-martial which condemned Marshal Bazaine to death.

At this time, having been appointed commander of the VII Army Corps at Besançon, Aumale retired from political life. In 1879, he became inspector-general of the army. The act of exception, passed in 1883, deprived all members of families who had reigned in France of their military commissions. Consequently, Aumale was placed on the unemployed supernumerary list.

In 1886, another law was promulgated which expelled from French territory the heads of former reigning families and provided that, henceforward, all members of those families should be disqualified from holding any public position or function and from election to any public body. Aumale protested energetically but was nonetheless expelled from France.

In his will, written on 3 June 1884, Aumale had bequeathed his Chantilly estate to the Institute of France, including the Château de Chantilly, which was to be turned into a museum displaying his large art collection. After this act of generosity was revealed, the French government withdrew the decree of exile, and the duke returned to France in 1889.

Bibliophile

Aumale was a notable collector of antique books and manuscripts and owned the important medieval Très Riches Heures du Duc de Berry. Most of his collection is still at Chantilly.

Death
Henri d'Orléans, duc d'Aumale, died in Lo Zucco, Sicily. After the fire of the Bazar de la Charité on 4 May 1897, which killed 126 people, mostly aristocratic women, he wanted to send his condolences to the families of the victims. After writing twenty letters, he suffered a cardiac arrest and died. He was buried in Dreux, in the chapel of the Orléans.

Honours 
 1842: Grand Cross of the Legion of Honour
 22 March 1842: Grand Cordon of the Order of Leopold
 6 September 1845: Knight of the Golden Fleece
 1864: Grand Cross of the Saxe-Ernestine House Order
 22 May 1886: Grand Cross of the Order of the Tower and Sword
 1887: Member of the Royal Academy of Science, Letters and Fine Arts of Belgium.
 1890: Charles Oberthür described & named parnassian butterfly P. orleans from China, named after the Duke who discovered it. 
 Grand Cross of the Order of St. Ferdinand and Merit
 Husainid Family Order
 Member of the Académie française.
 Member of the Académie des sciences morales et politiques

Arms
The duke of Aumale did not have a personal coat of arms, so used the traditional arms of the House of Orléans, consisting of:
 Blazon : Azure, three fleurs de lys or, a label argent 
 Coronet : of a fils de France
 Supporters : two angels
 Personal motto (after 1871) : J'attendrai (I'll be waiting)

Ancestry

References

Sources

External links

 Biography on 19ème Siècle site (in French)
 Académie française Website

1822 births
1897 deaths
Nobility from Paris
Princes of France (Orléans)
Dukes of Aumale
French art collectors
French book and manuscript collectors
Members of the Académie Française
Burials at the Chapelle royale de Dreux
Members of the Royal Academy of Belgium
Grand Croix of the Légion d'honneur
Knights of the Golden Fleece of Spain
Governors general of Algeria
Collectors from Paris
Military personnel from Paris
Children of Louis Philippe I
Sons of kings